Zeuxis (of Heraclea) was a Greek painter who flourished during the 5th century BCE and became famous for his ability to imitate nature and especially still life with his art.

Life and work

Zeuxis was an innovative Greek painter. Although his paintings have not survived, historical records state they were known for their realism, small scale, novel subject matter, and independent format. His technique created volumetric illusion through manipulating light and shadow, a change from the usual method of filling in shapes with flat color. Preferring small scale panels to murals, Zeuxis also introduced genre subjects (such as still life) into painting. He contributed to the composite method of composition, and may have originated an approach to, and thus influenced the concept of the ideal form of the nude, as described by art historian Kenneth Clark. As the story goes, according to Cicero, Zeuxis could not find a woman beautiful enough to pose as Helen of Troy, the most beautiful woman in the world, so he selected the finest features of five different models of the city of Croton to create a composite image of ideal beauty. 

Zeuxis was born in Heraclea in 464 BCE, probably Heraclea Lucania, in the present-day region of Basilicata in the southeastern "boot" of Italy. He may have studied with Demophilus of Himera (Sicily), or with Neseus of Thasos (an island in the northern Aegean Sea), and/or with the Greek painter Appollodorus. Records cite his notable works as Helen, Zeus Enthroned and The Infant Hercules Strangling the Serpents. He also painted an assembly of gods, Eros crowned with roses, Alcmene, Menelaus, an athlete, Pan, Marsyas chained, and an old woman. King Archelaus I of Macedon employed Zeuxis to decorate the palace of his new capital Pella with a picture of Pan.  Most of his works went to Rome and to Byzantium, but disappeared during the time of Pausanias.

Zeuxis is said to have died laughing at the humorous way he painted the goddess Aphrodite, after the old woman who commissioned it insisted on modeling for the portrait.

Painting contest
According to the Naturalis Historia by Pliny the Elder, Zeuxis and his contemporary Parrhasius (of Ephesus and later Athens) staged a contest to determine the greater artist. When Zeuxis unveiled his painting of grapes, they appeared so real that birds flew down to peck at them. But when Parrhasius, whose painting was concealed behind a curtain, asked Zeuxis to pull aside that curtain, the curtain itself turned out to be a painted illusion. Parrhasius won, and Zeuxis said, "I have deceived the birds, but Parrhasius has deceived Zeuxis."  This story was commonly referred to in 18th- and 19th-century art theory to promote spatial illusion in painting. A similar anecdote says that Zeuxis once drew a boy holding grapes, and when birds, once again, tried to peck them, he was extremely displeased, stating that he must have painted the boy with less skill, since the birds would have feared to approach otherwise.

Trivia

Zeuxis is briefly mentioned in the preface of Don Quixote by Cervantes:

Of all this there will be nothing in my book, for I have nothing to quote in the margin or to note at the end, and still less do I know what authors I follow in it, to place them at the beginning, as all do, under the letters A, B, C, beginning with Aristotle and ending with Xenophon, or Zoilus, or Zeuxis, though one was a slanderer and the other a painter.

See also
Ancient Greek art
Chiaroscuro
Hierarchy of genres
Trompe-l'œil

References

External links

Description of a painting by Zeuxis in "Zeuxis and Antiochus" by Lucian of Samosata (Vol. II) Gutenberg Project
Reference to the painting technique of Zeuxis by Aristotle from The Poetics Gutenberg Project

Ancient Greek painters
5th-century BC Greek people
Artists of Archelaus I of Macedon
Ancient Pella
Year of birth unknown
Year of death unknown
Deaths from laughter
5th-century BC painters